The Last Song is a British television sitcom which aired on BBC Two in two series of six episodes between 1981 and 1983. It was written by Carla Lane. In the first series Leo Bannister tries to juggle his life between his ex-wife, his two daughters and his new younger, girlfriend. In the second series he tries to reconcile with his wife.

Cast
 Geoffrey Palmer as Leo Bannister (13 episodes)
 Caroline Blakiston as  Alice Bannister (13 episodes)
 Hetty Baynes as  Jane Bannister (10 episodes)
 Gay Wilde as Alison Bannister (9 episodes)
 Nina Thomas as Liz Carroll (6 episodes)
 Barbara Flynn as  Shirley (6 episodes)

References

Bibliography
 Horace Newcomb. Encyclopedia of Television. Routledge, 2014.

External links
 

1981 British television series debuts
1983 British television series endings
1980s British comedy television series
BBC television sitcoms
English-language television shows